This is a list of flag bearers who have represented Uganda at the Olympics.

Flag bearers carry the national flag of their country at the opening ceremony of the Olympic Games.

See also
Uganda at the Olympics

References

Uganda at the Olympics
Uganda
Olympic flagbearers